Pelleh Shah (also Romanized as Pelleh Shāh; also known as Pīleh Shāh) is a village in Deylaman Rural District, Deylaman District, Siahkal County, Gilan Province, Iran. At the 2006 census, its population was 29, in 11 families.

References 

Populated places in Siahkal County